The American National Election Studies (ANES) are academically-run national surveys of voters in the United States, conducted before and after every presidential election. Though the ANES was formally established by a National Science Foundation grant in 1977, the data are a continuation of studies going back to 1948. The study has been based at the University of Michigan since its origin and, since 2005, has been run in partnership with Stanford University. Its principal investigators for the first four years of the partnership were Arthur Lupia and Jon Krosnick. As of 2017, the principal investigators are Ted Brader and Vincent Hutchings of the University of Michigan and Shanto Iyengar of Stanford University.

The studies ask the same questions repeatedly over time and are frequently cited in works of political science. Early ANES data were the basis for The American Voter (1960). Now ANES data are used by scholars, students, and journalists. ANES survey results have allowed for the detection of partisan bias in survey responses, showing that the respondent's political affiliation contributes to their responses. This even extends to questions with objective, known answers, like whether or not Iraq had weapons of mass destruction.

In 2006, ANES opened the ANES Online Commons to allow interested scholars and survey professionals to propose questions for future ANES surveys.

References

External links

Psephology
Elections in the United States